Gomarankadawala is a tiny village in the Trincomalee District of Sri Lanka, where 6 Sinhalese civilians were gunned down by suspected LTTE cadres in an incident known as the Gomarankadawala massacre.

Incident 
The Gomarankadawala massacre occurred on April 23, 2006, at  Kalyanapura, Gomarankadawala when the 6 victims were trying to retrieve a tractor that had got stuck in the mud in a paddy field. Suddenly, a group of  LTTE cadres raced from the nearby forest and indiscriminately fired on them. One Home Guard, who was engaged in farming during his leisure time, was also among those slain farmers.

Victims
6 civilians, including 4 school boys, lost their lives in this incident. All victims died on the spot before other villagers could rush into the paddy field to aid them.

The list of the dead civilians includes,
 M.D.Chaminda Prasanna Bandara  (27 years, a Home guard attached to the Gomarankadawala police)
 A.Anura Shantha Abeysena  (19 years, a student of Kalyanapura School)
 R.Eranda Sandaruwan Rupasena  (15 years, a GCE Ordinary level student ) 
 D.Lalith Bandara Dissanayake  (15 years, a GCE Ordinary level student),
 Ajith Kumara Ariywwansa  (19 years, a student of Kalyanapura School) 
 D.Wasantha Kumara  (24 years, a Farmer from the village)

References
Gunananda, A.T.M. "Gomarankadawala: “We need more security say villagers“ ", The Sunday Times, April 30, 2006.

Further reading 
"Kalyanapura, Gomarankadawala Massacre on 23 April 2006"

2006 crimes in Sri Lanka
Attacks on civilians attributed to the Liberation Tigers of Tamil Eelam
Massacres in Sri Lanka
Liberation Tigers of Tamil Eelam attacks in Eelam War IV
Mass murder in 2006
Mass murder of Sinhalese
Terrorist incidents in Sri Lanka in 2006